Midnight Chorus is the fifteenth studio album by Kathryn Williams, a Christmas-themed song collection in collaboration with British poet and playwright Dame Carol Ann Duffy, released by One Little Independent on 3 December 2021.

The pair met at Niddfest literary festival in 2016 and commenced writing songs together at Moniack Mhor centre in Scotland in early 2020. The album was put together remotely during 2021 due to the COVID-19 pandemic with producer Neill MacColl and fellow musicians Michele Stodart of the Magic Numbers, Astrid Williamson, Polly Paulusma, Sam Parton and Kate St John.

The album received positive reviews, with Narc magazine claiming the album contains "something suitable for everyone's festive celebrations", The Scotsman calling it "a gorgeous collaboration ... pick of the Christmas crop", and The Arts Desk concluding it captures the "intangible qualities of the season with all its bittersweet anticipations and disappointments".

Track listing 
All songs are written by Kathryn Williams and Carol Ann Duffy, except where noted.
 "Hang Fire" – 3:46
 "Hidden Meanings" – 3:05
 "Christmas Moon" – 3:58
 "(Please Be) Somewhere" – 3:45
 "Come All Ye Doubtful" – 4:03
 "Cariad" – 3:22
 "Apostle" (Williams, Duffy, Sam Parton) – 3:13
 "Dear Lord" – 3:56
 "Moniack Mohr" – 3:28
 "Snow Angel" – 3:34
 "Hope Street" – 4:02
 "Midnight Chorus" – 3:12

Personnel 

 Kathryn Williams – vocals, guitar, piano, organ, percussion
 Neill MacColl – guitars, bass, banjo, ukulele, keyboards, harmonica, backing vocals
 Kate St John – piano, keyboards, oboe, cor anglais, string arrangements
 Chris Jones – drums, percussion
 David Ford – drums
 Michele Stodart – bass, backing vocals
 Emily Barker – backing vocals
 Polly Paulusma – guitar, mandolin, backing vocals
 Astrid Williamson – piano, backing vocals
 Sam Parton – banjo, backing vocals
 Sam Amidon – fiddle

Production
 Neill MacColl – producer, engineer
 Dave Izumi – mixing at Echo Zoo studios
 Kathryn Williams – cover art and booklet illustrations

References 

2021 albums
Kathryn Williams albums
One Little Independent Records albums